Jedrick Wills Jr. (born May 17, 1999) is an American football offensive tackle for the Cleveland Browns of the National Football League (NFL). He played college football at Alabama and was drafted by the Browns in the first round of the 2020 NFL Draft.

Early life and high school career
Wills grew up in Lexington, Kentucky and attended Lafayette High School. He was named first-team All-State by the Associated Press as a junior and senior and was invited to play in the Under Armour All-America Game. Rated the top college prospect in the state of Kentucky, Wills committed to play college football at Alabama over offers from Kentucky, Michigan, Tennessee and Notre Dame.

College career
Wills appeared in 11 games as a true freshman with one start, which came when the Crimson Tide opened their game against Ole Miss with a six lineman formation. Wills was named the starter at right tackle going into his sophomore season. He started all 15 of the Crimson Tide's games and was named the Southeastern Conference (SEC) Offensive Lineman of the Week for week 7 against Missouri.

Wills was named a first-team preseason All-American by Athlon Sports and to the second-team by the Associated Press, The Sporting News, Sports Illustrated, USA Today entering his junior season. Wills was named a first-team midseason All-American by the Associated Press. He was named first-team All-SEC and was a consensus second-team All-America selection at the end of the season after starting all of the Crimson Tides' games and missing only seven total blocking assignments in 771 total snaps played. In January 2020, Wills announced that he would be forgoing his senior season to enter the 2020 NFL Draft.

Professional career 

Wills was drafted by the Cleveland Browns in the first round with the 10th overall pick of the 2020 NFL Draft. Wills made his debut in the season opener against the Baltimore Ravens before leaving the game due to a minor shin injury. In Week 10, Wills won the Pepsi NFL Rookie of the Week award for helping the Browns offense gain 231 rushing yards and a touchdown over the Houston Texans, becoming the first offensive lineman to win the award since 2013. He was placed on the reserve/COVID-19 list by the Browns on December 24, 2020, and activated two days later.

References

External links 
 Alabama Crimson Tide bio
Cleveland Browns bio

1999 births
Living people
Players of American football from Lexington, Kentucky
American football offensive tackles
Alabama Crimson Tide football players
Cleveland Browns players